Peta-Kaye Croft (born 5 August 1972, in Mount Isa) is an Australian Labor Party politician who represented the seat of Broadwater in the Legislative Assembly of Queensland. She entered Parliament at the 2001 election by defeating Allan Grice. She was defeated at the 2012 election by Verity Barton.

She was born in Mount Isa and lived in Townsville and Brisbane during her early years. She was educated on the Gold Coast boarding at St Hilda's School, and graduating from Griffith University with a Bachelor of Arts, majoring in Japanese. Croft is also a qualified swimming instructor and has strong interests in the environment and protecting native flora and fauna.

References

1972 births
Living people
Members of the Queensland Legislative Assembly
People from Mount Isa
Griffith University alumni
Australian Labor Party members of the Parliament of Queensland
21st-century Australian politicians
21st-century Australian women politicians
Women members of the Queensland Legislative Assembly